The  is a commercial botanical garden located in the city of Okinawa, Okinawa Prefecture, Japan. The garden is open daily; an admission fee is charged.

The Southeast Botanical Gardens closed in December 2010 and reopened on July 6, 2013 under a new management company, the Tapic Group.

See also 
 List of botanical gardens in Japan

References

External links
Southeast Botanical Gardens

Okinawa, Okinawa
Botanical gardens in Japan
Parks and gardens in Okinawa Prefecture